Caves Valley Golf Club is a member-owned not-for-profit corporation in Owings Mills, Maryland, a suburb northwest of Baltimore. The golf course opened  in 1991, and is known for its fast greens, rolling fairways, and water hazards; it was rated as 47th among America's best modern courses by Golfweek magazine in 1997.

Championships hosted
In 2002, Caves Valley played host to the U.S. Senior Open where Don Pooley bested Tom Watson in a dramatic five hole playoff. In addition, the club has hosted the 1995 U.S. Mid-Amateur, the NCAA Division I Men's (2005) and Women's Golf Championships (2009), the AJGA Canon Cup in 1997 and 2004, and the Palmer Cup in 2007. It hosted the inaugural International Crown in 2014, a biennial team event organized by the LPGA Tour involving four-woman teams from eight countries. In 2017 it played host to the Constellation Senior Players Championship.

Caves Valley hosted The BMW Championship, part of the FedEx Cup playoffs on the PGA Tour, in 2021.
Patrick Cantlay defeated Bryson DeChambeau in 6 playoff holes to win the championship.

References

External links 

Oobgolf.com: Caves Valley scorecard

1991 establishments in Maryland
Golf clubs and courses in Maryland
Golf clubs and courses designed by Tom Fazio
Buildings and structures in Baltimore County, Maryland
Buildings and structures in Owings Mills, Maryland